Frank Hamilton Clark (September 26, 1844 – November 29, 1882) was an American railroad executive and banker. He was president of the Lake Superior and Mississippi Railroad.

Early life 
Clark was born in Philadelphia, Pennsylvania. Clark was the fourth and youngest son of Sarah Crawford Dodge and Enoch White Clark. His father was the founder of the financial firm Clark, Dodge and Co., also known as E. W. Clark & Co., in Philadelphia in 1837 and by mid-century had become one of the city's 25 millionaires.

He entered the University of Pennsylvania to study science in 1859 and left in 1860. There, he was a member of the Delta Psi fraternity.

After the Civil War started, Clark enlisted in the 114th Pennsylvania Infantry Regiment as a first lieutenant on November 3, 1862. He served as an aide–de–camp for General David B. Birney. He was severely wounded in the Battle of Chancellorsville in May 1863 and was honorably discharged because of physical disability. He resigned from his active commission on November 5, 1866.

Career 
After the war, he joined the family firm and became a banker. He became president of the Lake Superior and Mississippi Railroad from 1871 to 1873.

Personal life 
Clark was elected a member of the Academy of Natural Sciences of Philadelphia in 1867. In 1871, Clark married Jessie Rice of St. Paul, Minnesota, daughter of Edmund Rice who was a lawyer, railroad president, and U.S. Representative. She died in 1874 at the age of 24.

In 1882, Clark died in Philadelphia.

External links

1844 births
1882 deaths
Clark banking family
University of Pennsylvania alumni
St. Anthony Hall
People of Pennsylvania in the American Civil War
E. W. Clark & Co.
American railroad executives